Neil Cameron may refer to:

Neil Cameron, Baron Cameron of Balhousie (1920–1985), former Marshal of the Royal Air Force
Neil Cameron (Manitoba politician) (1863–?), politician in Manitoba, Canada
Neil Cameron (Quebec politician) (1938–2019), politician in the Canadian province of Quebec
Neil Cameron (rugby union) (1929–1978), Scottish rugby union player

See also
Neill Cameron (born 1977), British comics artist and writer